John Mordaunt, 2nd Baron Mordaunt (1508–1571) was an English baron and member of the House of Lords. He had previously represented Bedfordshire in the House of Commons of England.

He was the eldest son of John Mordaunt, 1st Baron Mordaunt of Turvey by Elizabeth, the daughter and coheiress of Sir Henry Vere of Great Addington, Northamptonshire. He was knighted in 1533 and inherited the title Baron Mordaunt on his father's death in 1562.

He was appointed High Sheriff of Essex and High Sheriff of Hertfordshire for 1540–41 and Constable of Hertford Castle from 1554. He served as a Privy Councillor (PC) from 1553. He was elected MP for Bedfordshire in 1553, April and November 1554 and 1555.

He died in 1571 and was buried at Turvey. He had married twice: firstly  Ella, the daughter and heiress of John Fitzlewis, with whom he had several sons and 6 daughters and secondly Joan, the daughter of Richard Fermor of Easton Neston, Northamptonshire, and the widow of Robert Wilford of London. He was succeeded by his estranged son Lewis.

References
 
Stanley T. Bindoff, John S. Roskell, Lewis Namier, Romney Sedgwick, David Hayton, Eveline Cruickshanks, R. G. Thorne, P. W. Hasler, The House of Commons: 1509 - 1558; 1, Appendices, constituencies, members A - C, Volume 4 (1982), p. 614; Google Books

1508 births
1571 deaths
2
High Sheriffs of Essex
High Sheriffs of Hertfordshire
Members of the Privy Council of England
English MPs 1553 (Mary I)
English MPs 1554
English MPs 1554–1555
English MPs 1555
16th-century English nobility